Kevin Alwyn Barrett (10 July 1915 – 14 February 1984) was an Australian rules footballer who played with Collingwood and South Melbourne in the Victorian Football League (VFL).

After six seasons with Rochester in the Bendigo Football League, Barrett was recruited to Collingwood in 1940.

Notes

External links 

1915 births
Australian rules footballers from Victoria (Australia)
Collingwood Football Club players
Sydney Swans players
1984 deaths